The following are the Pulitzer Prizes for 1930.

Journalism awards
Public Service:
No award given
Reporting:
Russell Owen of The New York Times, for his reports by radio of the Byrd Antarctic Expedition.
Correspondence:
Leland Stowe of the New York Herald Tribune, for the series of articles covering conferences on reparations and the establishment of the international bank.
Editorial Writing:
No award given

Editorial Cartooning:
Charles R. Macauley of the Brooklyn Daily Eagle, for "Paying for a Dead Horse".
Special Citations and Awards
A special award to William O. Dapping of the Auburn Citizen (New York), for his report on a riot at Auburn Prison for the Associated Press.

Letters and Drama Awards
Novel:
Laughing Boy by Oliver La Farge (Houghton)
Drama:
The Green Pastures by Marc Connelly (Farrar)
History:
The War of Independence by Claude H. Van Tyne (Houghton)
Biography or Autobiography:
The Raven; A Biography of Sam Houston by Marquis James (Bobbs)
Poetry:
Selected Poems by Conrad Aiken (Scribner)

References

External links
Pulitzer Prizes for 1930

Pulitzer Prizes by year
Pulitzer Prize
Pulitzer Prize